Sergei Viktorovich Dudakov (born 13 January 1970) is a Russian figure skating coach and former competitor who represented the Soviet Union. He is the 1989 Golden Spin of Zagreb champion and a two-time (1989–90) Piruetten champion. He finished 7th at the 1987 World Junior Championships. He was coached by Viktor Kudriavtsev in Moscow.

Dudakov coached at DYUSSH No. 48 (Moscow) in 2006–11 before joining Eteri Tutberidze's group at Sambo 70 (Moscow) in the 2011–12 season. His past and present students include: Yulia Lipnitskaya (until 2015), Serafima Sakhanovich (2014–15), Evgenia Medvedeva (until 2018), Alina Zagitova, Alena Kostornaia, Anna Shcherbakova, Alexandra Trusova, Kamila Valieva, Sergei Voronov (2013–16), Adian Pitkeev (until 2016), Moris Kvitelashvili, and Polina Tsurskaya (2013–2018).

Competitive highlights

References 

1970 births
Soviet male single skaters
Russian figure skating coaches
Living people
Figure skaters from Moscow